The 2020 Cork Premier Intermediate Hurling Championship was the 17th staging of the  Cork Premier Intermediate Hurling Championship since its establishment by the Cork County Board in 2004. The draw for the group stage placings took place on 19 November 2019. The championship was scheduled to begin in April 2020, however, it was postponed indefinitely due to the coronavirus pandemic in Ireland. The championship began on 1 August 2020 and ended on 3 October 2020.

On 3 October 2020, Blarney won the championship after a 1-20 to 0-15 win over Castlelyons in the final at Páirc Uí Chaoimh. This was their second championship title overall and their first title since 2008.

Blarney's Mark Coleman was the championship's top scorer with 1-50.

Format change

On 26 March 2019, three championship proposals were circulated to Cork club delegates. A core element running through all three proposals, put together by the Cork GAA games workgroup, was that there be a group stage of 12 teams and straight relegation and promotion. On 2 April 2019, a majority of 136 club delegates voted for Option A which would see one round of games played in April and two more in August – all with county players available.

Team changes

To Championship 
Promoted from the Cork Intermediate Hurling Championship

 Blackrock

From Championship 
Promoted to the Cork Senior A Hurling Championship

 Cloyne
 Fermoy
 Fr. O'Neill's
 Kilworth
 Mallow

Participating teams

The club rankings were based on a championship performance 'points' system over the previous four seasons.

Fixtures/results

Group 1

Table

Results

Group 2

Table

Results

Group 3

Table

Results

Knock-out stage

Bracket

Relegation playoff

Quarter-finals

Semi-finals

Final

Championship statistics

Top scorers

Overall

In a single game

Match records

Widest winning margin: 17 points
Blarney 4-20 - 1-12 Carrigaline (Semi-final)
Most goals in a match: 5
Youghal 3-16 - 2-17 Courcey Rovers (Group Stage Round 2)
Carrigaline 5-18 - 0-20 Youghal (Group Stage Round 3)
Blarney 4-20 - 1-12 Carrigaline (Semi-final)
Most points in a match: 43
Carrigaline 0-26 - 1-17 Courcey Rovers (Group Stage Round 1)
Most goals by one team in a match: 5
Carrigaline 5-18 - 0-20 Youghal (Group Stage Round 3)
Most goals scored by a losing team: 2
Youghal 2-11 - 1-19 Aghada (Group Stage Round 1)
Aghada 2-15 - 2-21 Carrigaline (Group Stage Round 2)
Courcey Rovers 2-17 - 3-16 Youghal (Group Stage Round 2)
Most points scored by a losing team: 21 
Inniscarra 1-21 - 3-18 Castlelyons (Group Stage Round 3)

References

External link

 Cork GAA website

Cork Premier Intermediate Hurling Championship
Cork Premier Intermediate Hurling Championship